John William Fisher "Bill" Costerton  (July 21, 1934, Vernon, British Columbia – May 12, 2012, Kamloops, British Columbia) was a Canadian microbiologist and the main pioneer of the paradigm of microbial life as a community of microorganisms attached to hydrated surfaces by means of biofilms. He is sometimes referred to as the "Father of Biofilms" or the "King of Slime".

Biography
J. William Costerton grew up in Vernon, British Columbia. He endured hardship in his youth because of the early death of this father, Leonard Fisher Costerton (1906–1934), but he managed to graduate from Vernon High School and to attend the University of British Columbia. There he graduated in bacteriology with a bachelor's degree in 1955 and a master's degree in 1956. He received in 1960 his Ph.D. in bacteriology from the University of Western Ontario with doctoral advisor Robert George Everitt Murray. In 1955 J. William Costerton married Vivian Isobel McClounie, whom he met at Vernon High School. In 1960 the couple, in service to the Anglican Church, went to India with their first daughter, Diane, and their first son, John Colin (born in 1959). J. William Costerton served for three years as a medical missionary and developer of a premedical school under the missionary society of the Anglican Church. During these three years, he taught and became the dean of Baring Union Christian College in the Punjab and fluent in Hindustani. The infant John Colin Costerton died in 1961. The family returned briefly to British Columbia, where their second daughter, Sheila, was born in 1962, before the family returned to India. In 1963 the family went to England when J. William Costerton received the Nuffield Scholarship at the University of Cambridge, where he studied under Enid MacRobbie. The Costerton's son Robert was born in England. The Costerton family relocated from England to Montreal, where J. William Costerton did research in Robert Angus MacLeod's laboratory at McGill University. The Costerton's third daughter, Nancy, was born in Montreal. At McGill University, J. William Costerton was promoted to assistant professor in 1968. In the biology department of the University of Calgary, he became in 1970 an associate professor, in 1975 a full professor, and in 1993 a professor emeritus.

In 1993 J. William Costerton and his wife Vivian moved to Bozeman, Montana, where he became the director of Montana State University's Center for Biofilm Engineering (CBE).

In 2004 he became the director of the Center for Biofilms at the College of Dentistry at the University of Southern California (USC). There he and his team did research on biofilms involved in periodontal disease. In 2008 he became the director of biofilm research at Pittsburgh's Allegheny-Singer Research Institute (ASRI) and retained this directorship until his death in 2012.

He was the author or co-author of over 700 scientific publications. He held several biological patents.

The University of Copenhagen's Costerton Biofilm Center is named in his honour.

Upon his death he was survived by his widow, his three daughters, his second-born son Robert, nine grandchildren, and one great-grandchild.

Eponyms
 Costertonia

Selected publications
  (over 2050 citations)
  (over 4300 citations)
  (over 7200 citations)
  (over 4250 citations)
  (over 14200 citations)
  (over 5150 citations)
  (over 8100 citations)
  (over 2150 citations)
  (over 3650 citations)
  (over 7250 citations)
  (over 2100 citations)
  (over 1600 citations)

References

External links
 
 
 
 

1934 births
2012 deaths
University of British Columbia alumni
University of Western Ontario alumni
Academic staff of McGill University
Academic staff of the University of Calgary
Canadian microbiologists
Canadian Anglican missionaries
Fellows of the American Association for the Advancement of Science
Fellows of the Royal Society of Canada